was a town located in Naka District, Tokushima Prefecture, Japan.

As of 2003, the town had an estimated population of 2,242 and a density of 12.79 persons per km². The total area was 175.27 km².

On March 1, 2005, Kaminaka, along with the towns of Aioi and Wajiki, and the villages of Kisawa and Kito (all from Naka District), was merged to create the city of Naka.

External links 
  

Dissolved municipalities of Tokushima Prefecture
Naka, Tokushima